Viscount Chilston, of Boughton Malherbe in the County of Kent, is a title in the Peerage of the United Kingdom. It was created in 1911 for the Conservative politician and former Home Secretary, Aretas Akers-Douglas. The title derives from Chilston Park, Akers-Douglas's country house in Kent. He was made Baron Douglas of Baads, in the County of Midlothian, at the same time, also in the Peerage of the United Kingdom. His son, the second Viscount, served as British Ambassador to Russia from 1933 to 1938. He was succeeded by his eldest surviving son, the third Viscount.  the titles are held by the latter's first cousin once removed, the fourth Viscount, who succeeded in 1982. He is the grandson of the Hon. George Alexander Akers-Douglas, second son of the first Viscount.

The family seat now is The Old Rectory, near Twyford, Hampshire.

Viscounts Chilston (1911)
Aretas Akers-Douglas, 1st Viscount Chilston (1851–1926)
Aretas Akers-Douglas, 2nd Viscount Chilston (1876–1947)
Hon. Aretas Akers-Douglas (1905–1940)
Eric Alexander Akers-Douglas, 3rd Viscount Chilston (1910–1982)
Alastair George Akers-Douglas, 4th Viscount Chilston (b. 1946)

The heir apparent is the present holder's eldest son the Hon. Oliver Ian Akers-Douglas (b. 1973)
The heir apparent's heir apparent is his son Ivo Aretas Akers-Douglas (b. 2007)

References

External links

Kidd, Charles, Williamson, David (editors). Debrett's Peerage and Baronetage (1990 edition). New York: St Martin's Press, 1990, 

Viscountcies in the Peerage of the United Kingdom
Noble titles created in 1911
Noble titles created for UK MPs